Such A Surge was a German alternative/rap rock band. The band was formed in Braunschweig, Lower Saxony in 1992 and broke up in 2006.

Band members

Last line-up (in German), accessed: 8 October 2013.
Oliver Schneider – vocals
Michel Begeame – vocals
Lutz Buch – guitars
Axel Horn – bass
Carsten "Antek" Rudo – drums

Former members
Dennis Graef – guitars
Daniel Laudahn – drums
DJ Royal T – DJ
Rock DJ HandTrix - DJ

Discography

Studio albums

Compilation albums

Singles and EPs

References

External links

Rap metal musical groups
Musical groups established in 1992
1992 establishments in Germany
Musicians from Braunschweig